Mejorada del Campo is a municipality of Spain belonging to the Community of Madrid.

History 
Mejorada del Campo is first mentioned in a 1247 document, as one of the several places belonging to the personal lordship of the Bishops of Segovia south of the Sistema Central. Mejorada was incorporated to the Crown's dominions and properties in 1574.

Architecture 
The town has a self built cathedral which is still under construction since 12 October 1961. It is the magnum opus of former monk, Justo Gallego Martínez. The historic Chapel of San Fausto stands in the town.

See also
 Avianca Flight 011, a Colombian airliner that crashed in this town.

References
Citations

Bibliography

External links
 "Catedral" Documentary by Aliocha and by Alessio Rigo de Righi
 Ayuntamiento de Mejorada del Campo
 Don Justo's Self Built Cathedral

Municipalities in the Community of Madrid